A list of windmills in Morbihan, France.

External links
French windmills website

Windmills in France
Morbihan
Buildings and structures in Morbihan